Hongfa Temple is a Buddhist temple located at Fairylake Botanical Garden, Luohu District, Shenzhen, Guangdong, China.

History
Hongfa Temple was built in 1985 by Chan master Benhuan. The construction lasted from July 1985 to June 1992.

Architecture
The temple is at the foot of Wutong Mountain. The temple consists of forty buildings. The complex includes the following halls: Shanmen, Mahavira Hall, Hall of Four Heavenly Kings, Hall of Guanyin, Bell tower, Drum tower, Founder's Hall, Dharma Hall, Dining Room, etc.

Famous monks
 Benhuan
 Shi Yinshun

References

External links

  

Buildings and structures in Shenzhen
Buddhist temples in Guangdong
Tourist attractions in Shenzhen
1985 establishments in China
20th-century Buddhist temples
Religious buildings and structures completed in 1985